Jon Buscemi (born October 3, 1975) is an Italian-American fashion designer known for his work at Oliver Peoples, co-founding Gourmet, and his eponymous brand Buscemi. Jon Buscemi is a cousin of the famous actor Steve Buscemi.

Career
After working on Wall Street, Jon began to amass a very broad sneaker collection and soon took his hunt for very exclusive and limited edition sneakers world-wide. Simultaneously, many of his skateboarding peers started their own brands in the street-wear and skate space. Through these industry connections, Buscemi was hired by skateboard footwear brand DC Shoe Co. USA to work on special projects.

After DC, he left to become the Creative Director of Lotto USA, a partnership with the Italian tennis and soccer brand Lotto. Along with a small team of creatives, Buscemi launched Lotto Leggenda in the US before going on to work as a Brand Director at Oliver Peoples.

In 2006, Buscemi and two partners launched the footwear brand Gourmet. During his tenure at Gourmet, the company raised controversy and fandom alike by releasing sneakers that took design cues from iconic sneaker silhouettes, such as the Air Jordan 7 and Air Jordan 11. After leaving Gourmet in January 2013, Buscemi launched the eponymous brand Buscemi at Capsule Show in Paris in June 2013.

References

Living people
2010s fashion
American fashion designers
American fashion businesspeople
American people of Italian descent
1975 births